Héctor Bas (born 20 January 1951) is a Puerto Rican diver. He competed at the 1968 Summer Olympics and the 1972 Summer Olympics.

References

1951 births
Living people
Puerto Rican male divers
Olympic divers of Puerto Rico
Divers at the 1968 Summer Olympics
Divers at the 1972 Summer Olympics
Place of birth missing (living people)